Rapid Discount Outlet, formerly known as Rapid Hardware, was a Liverpool local DIY and home improvement retailing company. The company was run by Martin Doherty and Daniel Doherty (directors) since it opened.

History 

Rapid Hardware was opened by its founder Hugh Doherty in 1971, with one small store on Renshaw Street. It grew to over 200,000 sq ft of retail selling space employing over 300 people. In 2009 Rapid featured in the BBC TV series The Apprentice, in which all the candidates from the series had to pitch their ideas to store managers.

In 2009, the retailer relocated to the former George Henry Lee store, as the company grew. In the new building, Rapid expanded its product range to include home and garden, kitchens, lighting, bathrooms, indoor and outdoor furniture and homeware and hardware products.

In February 2013, Rapid Hardware went into administration. The administration was handled by Duff & Phelps. When the company went into administration it owed £2.97m.

The store re-opened in the same premises, with the name Rapid Discount Outlet, in May 2013. The company then went into administration for the second time in May 2017 with the store closing on 30 May.

References

External links
  (link no longer works)

Home improvement companies of the United Kingdom
Garden centres
British companies established in 1971
Retail companies established in 1971
Companies based in Liverpool
Companies that have entered administration in the United Kingdom
British companies disestablished in 2017
Retail companies disestablished in 2017